'Yasuj University is a public university in the province of Kohgiloyeh and Boyerahmad, Iran.

University Rank 
In 1398, Yasuj University rankings conducted by the Ministry of Science, Research and Technology was ranked 10th among comprehensive universities in the country and also from the Institute of Yasouj University ranking Times Higher Education as the second top university in Iran and 401-500 The world was achieved in 2020.

History 
Yasuj University was established in 1983. In the beginning, it was a part of Shiraz University and named as Technical Institute of Yasuj. It was active in the field of rural development and mechanics of welding.

The Technical Institute was promoted to Yasuj University and was separated from Shiraz University in May 1992. The Yasuj University was started with three faculties of Science, Engineering, and Agricultural. Furthermore, a high school and college center is affiliated with the University.

The Yasuj University was developed rapidly. At the moment the university has six faculties of engineering, science, agricultural, science-industry, mining of Choram which related to the Institute of Natural Resources and Environment, and social studies and language of indigenous. It also includes a College University.

The University has 22 departments with a total of 50 educational branches for undergraduate students, 120 educational branches for master students, and 40 educational branches of Ph.D. with over 6,000 students total. The university is under development in both physical areas and education.

 Universities in Iran
fa:دانشگاه یاسوج